The women's team of Tennis Borussia Berlin was established in 1969 and gained promotion to the newly created Bundesliga in 1991, where they played for six years. After two relegations to the Regionalliga in 1997 and 2003 they successfully participated in the 2. Bundesliga from 2004 on. In 2009 they became league champions, gaining promotion back to the Bundesliga, but were relegated again the following season.

Since 2013 the team plays in the seven-a-side women's Verbandsliga Berlin.

External links 
  

Women
Women's football clubs in Germany
Football clubs in Berlin
1969 establishments in Germany
Frauen-Bundesliga clubs